Elachista unicornis is a moth in the family Elachistidae. It was described by Parenti in 1991. It is found in Mongolia.

References

Moths described in 1991
unicornis
Moths of Asia